The 2015–16 Scottish League One (referred to as the Ladbrokes League One for sponsorship reasons) was the 21st season in the current format of 10 teams in the third-tier of Scottish football.

Teams
Promoted from Scottish League Two
 Albion Rovers

Relegated from Scottish Championship
 Cowdenbeath

Stadia and locations

Personnel

Managerial changes

League table

Results
Teams play each other four times, twice in the first half of the season (home and away) and twice in the second half of the season (home and away), making a total of 36 games.

First half of season

Second half of season

Season statistics

Scoring

Top scorers

Hat-tricks

Discipline

Player

Yellow cards

Red cards

Club

Yellow cards

Red cards

Awards

Monthly awards

League One play-offs
Cowdenbeath, the second bottom team, entered into a 4-team playoff with the 2nd-4th placed teams in 2015–16 Scottish League Two; Elgin City, Clyde, and Queen's Park.

Semi-finals

First leg

Second leg

Final
The winners of the semi-finals, Clyde and Queen's Park, then competed against one another over two legs, with the winner replacing Cowdenbeath and being promoted to the 2016–17 Scottish League One.

First leg

Second leg

References

Scottish League One seasons
3
3
Scot